Aureation ("to make golden", from ) is a device in arts of rhetoric that involves the "gilding" (or supposed heightening) of diction in one language by the introduction of terms from another, typically a classical language considered to be more prestigious. Aureation commonly involves other mannered rhetorical features in diction; for example circumlocution, which bears a relation to more native literary devices such as the kenning. It can be seen as analogous to Gothic schools of ornamentation in carving, painting, or ceremonial armoury.

In terms of prosody it stands in direct contrast to plain language and its use is sometimes regarded, by current standards of literary taste, as overblown and exaggerated. But aureated expression does not necessarily mean loss of precision or authenticity in poetry when handled by good practitioners.

Loanwords and neologisms
In the context of language development, aureation can be seen as an extension of processes in which historically vernacular languages are expanded through loan words. In Europe this usually meant borrowings from Latin and Greek. The medieval and renaissance periods were a fertile time for such borrowings and in Germanic languages, such as English and Scots, Greek and Latinate coinages were particularly highlighted (see classical compounds especially), though this has sometimes been decried as pretentious, these coinages being criticized as inkhorn terms. While many classically derived loan words become useful new terms in the host language, some more mannered or polysyllabic aureations may tend to remain experimental and decorative curiosities.

In the British Isles, aureation has often been most associated with Scottish renaissance makars, especially William Dunbar or Gavin Douglas, who commonly drew on the rhetoric and diction of classical antiquity in their work. After Europe's colonial era widened the orbits of cultural contact, aureation could in theory draw on other ancient languages such as Sanskrit.

Example
An example of considered diction with an aureate inflection occurs in the Scots couplet

Aureate diction occurs in the noun phrase golden candle matutine, a circumlocution which stands for sun. The couplet can thus be translated as: up rose the sun with clear pure crystal light. 

Dunbar himself uses the term later in the same poem in a passage that employs the limits to expression topos. It occurs as part of a dream vision in which the makar is describing the army of goddesses he has witnessed alighting upon the earth: 

In simple modern English, this means: "I would (attempt to) describe (the scene), but who could satisfactorily frame in verse the way in which all the fields were radiantly adorned by those white lilies (the landing army) that shone upwards into the sky? Not you, Homer, sublime as you were in writing, for all your faultlessly ornate diction; nor you, Cicero, whose sweet lips were so consistently lucid in rhetoric: your aureate tongues both [the Greek and the Roman] were not adequate to describe that vision in full."

See also

References

Sources

Fowler, Alastair. The History of English Literature, Harvard University Press, Cambridge, MA (1989) 
Kinsley, James. William Dunbar: Poems, Oxford Clarendon Press, (1958)

External links

Literary concepts
Rhetorical techniques
Stylistics